The 2014 Drive DMACK Cup season was the first season of the Drive DMACK Cup, an auto racing championship recognized by the Fédération Internationale de l'Automobile, running in support of the World Rally Championship. It used Ford Fiesta R2s, and was a cost-effective series within the Championship which offered a prize drive of a full WRC-2 season in a Ford Fiesta R5 car in 2015.

The inaugural championship was won by Estonia's Sander Pärn, winning three of the five events to be held. Pärn finished 19 points clear of his nearest rival, Tom Cave, who won Rallye Deutschland, and like Pärn took four top-two finishes during the season. Quentin Gilbert finished third in the championship, after Yeray Lemes was given a 25-point penalty for missing the final round of the season. Gilbert won the most stages during the season with 27, which allowed him to advance up the championship as each stage win counted for a point in the drivers' championship. The only other driver to win a rally was Nil Solans, who won his home event at the Rally de Catalunya. Pärn's co-driver James Morgan won the co-drivers' championship by a similar margin to his driver, over Cave's co-driver Craig Parry.

Calendar

The final 2014 Drive DMACK Cup calendar consisted of five European events, running as part of the 2014 World Rally Championship season.

Drivers

The following drivers took part in the championship.

Rally summaries

Championship standings

FIA Drive DMACK Cup for Drivers

FIA Drive DMACK Cup for Co-Drivers

References

External links
Official website of the World Rally Championship
Official website of the Fédération Internationale de l'Automobile

2014
2014 in rallying